Barnard College is a private women's liberal arts college in the borough of Manhattan in New York City. It was founded in 1889 by a group of women led by young student activist Annie Nathan Meyer, who petitioned Columbia University's trustees to create an affiliated college named after Columbia's recently deceased 10th president, Frederick A.P. Barnard. 

Barnard College was one of more than 120 women's colleges founded in the 19th century, and one of fewer than 40 in existence today solely dedicated to the academic empowerment of women.

Barnard is one of Columbia University's four undergraduate colleges. Founded as a response to Columbia's refusal to admit women into their institution until 1983, Barnard is affiliated with but legally and financially separate from Columbia. Students share classes, libraries, clubs, Greek life, athletic fields, and dining halls with Columbia, as well as sports teams, through the Columbia-Barnard Athletic Consortium, a unique agreement that makes Barnard the only women's college to offer its students the ability to compete in NCAA Division I athletics. Students receive their diploma from Columbia University signed by both Presidents of Columbia and Barnard.

Barnard offers Bachelor of Arts degree programs in about 50 areas of study. Students may also pursue elements of their education at Columbia, the Juilliard School, the Manhattan School of Music, and The Jewish Theological Seminary, which are also based in New York City. Its  campus is located in the Upper Manhattan neighborhood of Morningside Heights, stretching along Broadway between 116th and 120th Streets. It is directly across from Columbia's main campus and near several other academic institutions.

The college is one of the original Seven Sisters—seven highly selective liberal arts colleges in the Northeastern United States that were historically women's colleges (five currently exist as women's colleges).

Barnard College alumnae include many prominent leaders in science, religion, politics, the Peace Corps, medicine, law, education, communications, theater, and business. Barnard graduates have been recipients of Emmy, Tony, Grammy, Academy, and Peabody Awards, Guggenheim Fellowships, MacArthur Fellowships, the Presidential Medal of Freedom, the National Medal of Science, and the Pulitzer Prize.

History

Founding 

For its first 229 years Columbia College of Columbia University admitted only men for undergraduate study. Barnard College was founded in 1889 as a response to Columbia's refusal to admit women into its institution.

The college was named after Frederick Augustus Porter Barnard, a deaf American educator and mathematician who served as the 10th president of Columbia from 1864 to 1889. He advocated for equal educational privileges for men and women, preferably in a coeducational setting, and began proposing in 1879 that Columbia admit women.

Columbia's Board of Trustees repeatedly rejected Barnard's suggestion, but in 1883 agreed to create a detailed syllabus of study for women. While they could not attend Columbia classes, those who passed examinations based on the syllabus would receive a degree. The first such woman graduate received her bachelor's degree in 1887.  A former student of the program, Annie Meyer, and other prominent New York women persuaded the board in 1889 to create a women's college connected to Columbia.

Men and women were evenly represented among the founding Trustees of Barnard College.  The males were Rev. Dr. Arthur Brooks (chair of the board), Silas B. Brownell, Frederick R. Coudert, Noah Davis, George Hoadley, Hamilton W. Mabie, George Arthur Plimpton, Jacob Schiff, Francis Lynde Stetson, Henry Van Dyke, and Everett P. Wheeler. The founding female trustees of Barnard College were Augusta Arnold (née Foote), Helen Dawes Brown, Virginia Brownwell (née Swinburne), Caroline Sterling Choate, Annie Nathan Meyer, Laura Rockefeller, Clara C. Stranahan (née Harrison), Henrietta E. Talcott (née Francis), Ella Weed, Alice Williams, and Frances Fisher Wood.

Barnard College's original 1889 home was a rented brownstone at 343 Madison Avenue, where a faculty of six offered instruction to 14 students in the School of Arts, as well as to 22 "specials", who lacked the entrance requirements in Greek and so enrolled in science.

Morningside campus 
When Columbia University announced in 1892 its impending move to Morningside Heights, Barnard built a new campus nearby with gifts from Mary E. Brinckerhoff, Elizabeth Milbank Anderson and Martha Fiske. Two of these gifts were made with several stipulations attached. Brinckerhoff had offered $100,000 in 1892, on the condition that Barnard acquire land within 1,000 feet of the Columbia campus within the next four years. The Barnard trustees purchased land between 119th-120th Streets after receiving funds for that purpose in 1895. Anderson, who gave $170,000, requested that Charles A. Rich be hired. Rich designed the Milbank, Brinckerhoff, and Fiske Halls, built in 1897–1898; these were listed on the National Register of Historic Places in 2003. The first classes at the new campus were held in 1897. Despite Brinckerhoff's, Anderson's, and Fiske's gifts, Barnard remained in debt.

Ella Weed supervised the college in its first four years; Emily James Smith succeeded her as Barnard's first dean. Jessica Finch is credited with coining the phrase "current events" while teaching at Barnard College in the 1890s.

As the college grew it needed additional space, and in 1903 it received the three blocks south of 119th Street from Anderson who had purchased a former portion of the Bloomingdale Asylum site from the New York Hospital. Rich provided a master plan for the campus, but only Brooks Hall was built, being constructed between 1906 and 1908. None of Rich's other plans were carried out. Students' Hall, now known as Barnard Hall, was built in 1916 to a design by Arnold Brunner. Hewitt Hall was the last structure to be erected, in 1926–1927. All three buildings were listed on the National Register of Historic Places in 2003. An inability to raise funds precluded the construction of any other buildings.

By the mid-20th century Barnard had succeeded in its original goal of providing a top-tier education to women. Between 1920 and 1974, only the much larger Hunter College and University of California, Berkeley produced more women graduates who later received doctorate degrees. In the 1970s, Barnard faced considerable pressure to merge with male only Columbia College, which was fiercely resisted by its president, Jacquelyn Mattfeld.

Academics 
Barnard students are able to pursue a Bachelor of Arts degree in about 50 areas of study. Joint programs for the Bachelor of Science and other degrees exist with Columbia University, Juilliard School, and The Jewish Theological Seminary.
Econometrics and Quantitative Economics (62)
Research and Experimental Psychology (56)
History (43)
English Language and Literature (39)
Political Science and Government (36)
Neuroscience (33)
Art History, Criticism and Conservation (33)

The liberal arts general education requirements are collectively called Foundations. Students must take two courses in the sciences (one of which must be accompanied by a laboratory course), study a single foreign language for two semesters, and take two courses in the arts/humanities as well as two in the social sciences. In addition, students must complete at least one three-credit course in each of the following categories, known as the Modes of Thinking: Thinking Locally—New York City, Thinking through Global Inquiry, Thinking about Social Difference, Thinking with Historical Perspective, Thinking Quantitatively and Empirically, and Thinking Technologically and Digitally. The use of AP or IB credit to fulfill these requirements is very limited (students are limited to the transfer of 16 credits), but Foundations courses may overlap with major or minor requirements. In addition to the distributional requirements and the Modes of Thinking, students must complete a first-year seminar, a first-year writing course, and one semester of physical education. Foundations replaced the old general education requirements, called the Nine Ways of Knowing, in 2016.

Admissions 

Admissions to Barnard is considered "most selective" by U.S. News & World Report. It is the most selective women's college in the nation; in 2017, Barnard had the lowest acceptance rate of the five Seven Sisters that remain single-sex in admissions.

The class of 2026's admission rate was 8% of the 12,009 applicants, the lowest acceptance rate in the institution's history. The median SAT composite score of enrolled students was 1440, with median subscores of 720 in Math and 715 in Evidence-Based Reading and Writing. The median ACT Composite score was 33.

In 2015, Barnard announced that it would admit transgender women who "consistently live and identify as women, regardless of the gender assigned to them at birth" and would continue to support and enroll those students who transitioned to male after they had already been admitted.

Rankings 

Barnard is ranked tied at 17th overall, tied for 16th in "Most Innovative Schools," tied for 64th for "Best Undergraduate Teaching," and 38th schools for "Best Value" for 2022 among U.S. liberal arts colleges by U.S. News & World Report. Forbes ranked Barnard the 19th best liberal arts college in 2019 and ranked it 50th among 650 universities, liberal arts colleges, and service academies.

Campus

Library 

 While Barnard students have access to the libraries at Columbia University, the college has always maintained a library of its own. Lehman Hall was the site of Barnard's Wollman Library from its opening in 1959 until 2015. In August 2016, Lehman Hall was demolished to make way for a new library facility. Barnard's Milstein Center for Teaching and Learning opened in September 2018. The Barnard Library also encompasses the Archives and Special Collections, a repository of official and student publications, photographs, zines, letters, alumnae scrapbooks and other material that documents Barnard's history from its founding in 1889 to the present day. Among the collections are the Ntozake Shange papers and various student publications.

Zine Collection 

Founded in 2003 by then-Coordinator of References Services, librarian and zinester Jenna Freedman, the Barnard Zine Library is a unit of the Barnard Library and Academic Information Systems (BLAIS), whose other components are the Barnard Archives and Special Collections, Instructional Media and Technology Services (IMATS) Collections and Services, Operations, and Teaching, Learning & Research Services.

According to Freedman, who is now the Barnard Zine Library curator, zine collections such as Barnard's provide a place on campus that is primarily female, default queer, intentionally of color, and gender expansive. The library is meant to be a home for the voices of young women and others otherwise underrepresented in library collections. The Zine Library's website states:

"Barnard's zines reflect Barnard College's student population. We have zines by women, nonbinary people, and trans men, with a collection emphasis on zines by women of color and a newer effort to acquire more zines by trans women. We collect zines on feminism and femme identity by people of all genders. The zines are personal and political publications on activism, anarchism, body image, gender, parenting, queer community, riot grrrl, sexual assault, trans feminisms, and other topics. Our zines are at the lower end of the production level scale and typically cost $10 or less, with most of them in the $1-$5 range."

As of February 2022, the library had approximately 7,000 unique zine titles/issues available to library patrons, including zines about race, gender, sexuality, childbirth, motherhood, politics, and relationships. Zine library staff attempt to acquire two copies of any given zine. The first is filed in the college's climate-controlled, acid-free archives. Second copies are shelved in open stacks for lending. Both collections are cataloged in CLIO, the Columbia/Barnard online public access catalog[] and housed in the Milstein Center for Teaching and Learning.

Student life

Student organizations 

Every Barnard student is part of the Student Government Association (SGA), which elects a representative student government. SGA aims to facilitate the expression of opinions on matters that directly affect the Barnard community.

Student groups include theatre and vocal music groups, language clubs, literary magazines, a freeform radio station called WBAR, a biweekly magazine called the Barnard Bulletin, community service groups, and others.

Barnard students can also join extracurricular activities or organizations at Columbia University, while Columbia University students are allowed in most, but not all, Barnard organizations. Barnard's McIntosh Activities Council (commonly known as McAC), named after the first President of Barnard, Millicent McIntosh, organizes various community focused events on campus, such as Big Sub and Midnight Breakfast. McAC is made up of five sub-committees which are the Mosaic committee (formerly known as Multicultural), the Wellness committee, the Network committee, the Community committee, and the Action committee. Each committee has a different focus, such as hosting and publicizing identity and cultural events (Mosaic), having health and wellness related events (Wellness), giving students opportunities to be involved with Alumnae and various professionals (Network), planning events that bring the entire student body together (Community), and planning community service events that give back to the surrounding community (Action).

Sororities 
Barnard students participate in Columbia's six National Panhellenic Conference sororities—Alpha Chi Omega, Alpha Omicron Pi, Delta Gamma, Gamma Phi Beta, Kappa Alpha Theta, and Sigma Delta Tau—and the National Pan-Hellenic Council Sororities- Alpha Kappa Alpha (Lambda chapter) and Delta Sigma Theta (Rho chapter) as well as other sororities in the Multicultural Greek Council. Two National Panhellenic Conference organizations were founded at Barnard College. The Alpha Omicron Pi fraternity, founded on January 2, 1897, left campus during the college's 1913 ban on sororities but returned to establish its Alpha chapter in 2013. The Alpha Epsilon Phi, founded on October 24, 1909, is no longer on campus. , Barnard does not fully recognize the National Panhellenic Conference sororities at Columbia, but it does provide some funding to account for Barnard students living in Columbia housing through these organizations.

Traditions 
Barnard Greek Games: One of Barnard's oldest traditions, the Barnard Greek Games were first held in 1903, and occurred annually until the Columbia University protests in 1968. Since then they have been sporadically revived. The games consist of competitions between each graduating class at Barnard, and events have traditionally included Greek poetry recitation, dance, chariot racing, and a torch race.

Take Back the Night: Each April, Barnard and Columbia students participate in the Take Back the Night march and speak-out. This annual event grew out of a 1988 Seven Sisters conference. The march has grown from under 200 participants in 1988 to more than 2,500 in 2007.

Midnight Breakfast marks the beginning of finals week. As a highly popular event and long-standing college tradition, Midnight Breakfast is hosted by the student-run activities council, McAC (McIntosh Activities Council). In addition to providing standard breakfast foods, each year's theme is also incorporated into the menu. Past themes have included "I YUMM the 90s," "Grease," and "Take Me Out to the Ballgame." The event is a school-wide affair as college deans, trustees and the president serve food to about a thousand students. It takes place the night before finals begin every semester.

Big Sub: Towards the beginning of each fall semester, Barnard College supplies a 700+ feet long subway sandwich. Students from the college can take as much of the sub as they can carry. The sub has kosher, dairy free, vegetarian, and vegan sections. This event is organized by the student-run activities council, McAC.

Academic affiliations

Relationship with Columbia University 

The Barnard Bulletin in 1976 described the relationship between the college and Columbia University as "intricate and ambiguous". Barnard president Debora Spar said in 2012 that "the relationship is admittedly a complicated one, a unique one and one that may take a few sentences to explain to the outside community".
Outside sources often describe Barnard as part of Columbia; The New York Times in 2013, for example, called Barnard "an undergraduate women's college of Columbia University". Its front gates read "Barnard College of Columbia University."

Barnard describes itself as "both an independently incorporated educational institution and an official college of Columbia University" that is "one of the University's four colleges, but we're largely autonomous, with our own leadership and purse strings", and advises students to state "Barnard College, Columbia University" or "Barnard College of Columbia University" on résumés. 

Columbia describes Barnard as an affiliated institution that is a faculty of the university or is "in partnership with" it. Both the college and Columbia evaluate Barnard faculty for tenure, and Barnard graduates receive Columbia diplomas signed by the Barnard and the Columbia presidents.

Before coeducation at Columbia 
Smith and Columbia president Seth Low worked to open Columbia classes to Barnard students. By 1900 they could attend Columbia classes in philosophy, political science, and several scientific fields. That year Barnard formalized an affiliation with the university which made available to its students the instruction and facilities of Columbia. Franz Boas, who taught at both Columbia and Barnard in the early 1900s, was among those faculty members who reportedly found Barnard students superior to their male Columbia counterparts. From 1955 Columbia and Barnard students could register for the other school's classes with the permission of the instructor; from 1973 no permission was needed.

Except for Columbia College, by the 1940s other undergraduate and graduate divisions of Columbia University admitted women. Columbia president William J. McGill predicted in 1970 that Barnard College and Columbia College would merge within five years. In 1973 Columbia and Barnard signed a three-year agreement to increase sharing classrooms, facilities, and housing, and cooperation in faculty appointments, which they described as "integration without assimilation"; by the mid-1970s most Columbia dormitories were coed. The university's financial difficulties during the decade increased its desire to merge to end what Columbia described as the "anachronism" of single-sex education, but Barnard resisted doing so because of Columbia's large debt, rejecting in 1975 Columbia dean Peter Pouncey's proposal to merge Barnard and the three Columbia undergraduate schools. The 1973–1976 chairwoman of the board at Barnard, Eleanor Thomas Elliott, led the resistance to this takeover. The college's marketing emphasized the Columbia relationship, however, the Bulletin in 1976 stating that Barnard described it as identical to the one between Harvard College and Radcliffe College ("who are merged in practically everything but name at this point").

After Barnard rejected subsequent merger proposals from Columbia and a one-year extension to the 1973 agreement expired, in 1977 the two schools began discussing their future relationship. By 1979 the relationship had so deteriorated that Barnard officials stopped attending meetings. Because of an expected decline in enrollment, in 1980 a Columbia committee recommended that Columbia College begin admitting women without Barnard's cooperation. A 1981 committee found that Columbia was no longer competitive with other Ivy League universities without women, and that admitting women would not affect Barnard's applicant pool. That year Columbia president Michael Sovern agreed for the two schools to cooperate in admitting women to Columbia, but Barnard faculty's opposition caused president Ellen Futter to reject the agreement.

A decade of negotiations for a Columbia-Barnard merger akin to Harvard and Radcliffe had failed. In January 1982, the two schools instead announced that Columbia College would begin admitting women in 1983, and Barnard's control over tenure for its faculty would increase; previously, a committee on which Columbia faculty outnumbered Barnard's three to two controlled the latter's tenure. Applications to Columbia rose 56% that year, making admission more selective, and nine Barnard students transferred to Columbia. Eight students admitted to both Columbia and Barnard chose Barnard, while 78 chose Columbia. Within a few years, however, selectivity rose at both schools as they received more women applicants than expected.

After coeducation 
The Columbia-Barnard affiliation continued.  Barnard pays Columbia about $5 million a year under the terms of the "interoperate relationship", which the two schools renegotiate every 15 years. Despite the affiliation Barnard is legally and financially separate from Columbia, with an independent faculty and board of trustees. It is responsible for its own separate admissions, health, security, guidance and placement services, and has its own alumnae association. Nonetheless, Barnard students participate in the academic, social, athletic and extracurricular life of the broader University community on a reciprocal basis. The affiliation permits the two schools to share some academic resources; for example, only Barnard has an urban studies department, and only Columbia has a computer science department. Most Columbia classes are open to Barnard students and vice versa. Barnard students and faculty are represented in the University Senate, and student organizations such as the Columbia Daily Spectator are open to all students. Barnard students play on Columbia athletics teams, and Barnard uses Columbia email, telephone and network services.

Barnard athletes compete in the Ivy League (NCAA Division I) through the Columbia/Barnard Athletic Consortium, which was established in 1983. Through this arrangement, Barnard is the only women's college offering DivisionI athletics. There are 15 intercollegiate teams, and students also compete at the intramural and club levels. From 1975 to 1983, before the establishment of the Columbia/Barnard Athletic Consortium, Barnard students competed as the "Barnard Bears". Prior to 1975, students referred to themselves as the "Barnard honeybears".

Controversies 
In the spring of 1960, Columbia University president Grayson Kirk complained to the president of Barnard that Barnard students were wearing inappropriate clothing. The garments in question were pants and Bermuda shorts. The administration forced the student council to institute a dress code. Students would be allowed to wear shorts and pants only at Barnard and only if the shorts were no more than two inches above the knee and the pants were not tight. Barnard women crossing the street to enter the Columbia campus wearing shorts or pants were required to cover themselves with a long coat.

In March 1968, The New York Times ran an article on students who cohabited, identifying one of the persons they interviewed as a student at Barnard College from New Hampshire named "Susan". Barnard officials searched their records for women from New Hampshire and were able to determine that "Susan" was the pseudonym of a student (Linda LeClair) who was living with her boyfriend, a student at Columbia University. She was called before Barnard's student-faculty administration judicial committee, where she faced the possibility of expulsion. A student protest included a petition signed by 300 other Barnard women, admitting that they too had broken the regulations against cohabitating. The judicial committee reached a compromise and the student was allowed to remain in school, but was denied use of the college cafeteria and barred from all social activities. The student briefly became a focus of intense national attention. She eventually dropped out of Barnard.

Administration 
The following lists all the presidents and deans of Barnard College from 1889 to present.

 Ella Weed (1889–1894)
 Emily James Smith (1894–1900)
 Laura Drake Gill (1901–1907)
 Virginia Gildersleeve (1911–1947)
 Millicent McIntosh (1952–1962)
 Rosemary Park (1962–1967)
 Martha Peterson (1967–1975)
 Jacquelyn Mattfeld (1976–1981)
 Ellen Futter (1981–1993)
 Judith Shapiro (1994–2008)
 Debora Spar (2008–2017)
 Sian Beilock (2017–present)

Notable people 

Barnard College has graduated many prominent leaders in science, religion, politics, the Peace Corps, medicine, law, education, communications, theater, and business; and acclaimed actors, architects, artists, astronauts, engineers, human rights activists, inventors, musicians, philanthropists, and writers. They include academic Louise Holland (1914), author Zora Neale Hurston (1928), author and political activist Grace Lee Boggs (1935), television host Ronnie Eldridge (1952), Phyllis E. Grann, CEO of Penguin Putnam, U.S. Representative Helen Gahagan (1924), Spelman College's 11th President and former chair of the Presidential Advisory Council on HIV/AIDS Helene D. Gayle (1970), president of the American Civil Liberties Union Susan Herman (1968), Chief Judge of the New York Court of Appeals Judith Kaye (1958), chair of the National Labor Relations Board Wilma B. Liebman (1971), musician and performance artist Laurie Anderson (1969), actress, activist, and gubernatorial candidate Cynthia Nixon (1988), author of The Sisterhood of the Traveling Pants Ann Brashares (1989), The New Yorker cartoonist Amy Hwang (2000), actress from Grey's Anatomy Kelly McCreary (2003), writer and director Greta Gerwig (2004), and Disney Channel actress Christy Carlson Romano (2015).

See also 

 Athena Film Festival
 Barnard Center for Research on Women
 Hidden Ivies: Thirty Colleges of Excellence
 Women's colleges in the United States

References

Citations

Sources

Horowitz, Helen Lefkowitz (1993). Alma Mater: Design and Experience in the Women's Colleges from Their Nineteenth-Century Beginnings to the 1930s (2nd edition). Amherst: University of Massachusetts Press.

External links 

 
 

 

 
1889 establishments in New York (state)
Columbia University
Educational institutions established in 1889
Liberal arts colleges in New York City
Morningside Heights, Manhattan
Private universities and colleges in New York (state)
Private universities and colleges in New York City
Seven Sister Colleges
Universities and colleges in Manhattan
Women's universities and colleges in the United States